Yevgeny Kafelnikov was the defending champion, but lost in the semifinals this year.

Fabrice Santoro won the tournament, beating Tommy Haas 6–4, 6–4 in the final.

Seeds

Draw

Finals

Top half

Bottom half

References
 Main Draw

1997 ATP Tour